Ryan Bedford (born October 20, 1986 in Yuma, Arizona) is an American speed skater who competed at the 2010 Winter Olympics.

External links
 
 
 
 
 

1986 births
Living people
American male speed skaters
Olympic speed skaters of the United States
Speed skaters at the 2010 Winter Olympics
People from Yuma, Arizona
American male short track speed skaters